Nguyễn Hồng Tiến (born 6 July 1985) is a Vietnamese footballer who plays as a defender for V-League club Hà Nội T&T and the Vietnam national football team. He was known for his violent behavior against Lê Văn Sơn in the match between Hanoi T&T and HAGL. Nguyễn Hồng Tiến deliberately kicked Lê Văn Sơn in his face while this player was lying on the ground.

References 

1998 births
Living people
Vietnamese footballers
Association football defenders
V.League 1 players
Hanoi FC players
Vietnam international footballers